The Daejeon Museum of Art (also called the Daejeon Metropolitan Museum of Arts) is located at 396 Mannyeon-dong, Seo-gu, across the river from the Expo Science Park, in Daejeon, South Korea. It opened on April 15, 1998.

It has featured modern art from both domestic and foreign artists. Shows have included "The Horizen  of Daejeon Art" (local art, featuring Cho Pyung-hwi and An Chi-in) and The Exhibition of Park Seung-moo. The facility has a floor space of just over 8,400 m². It also includes an outdoor sculpture park.

Transition 
The Daejeon Museum of Art is a public art museum that explores trends in Korean contemporary art in general and seeks to spread the arts and culture in civil society through exhibition and educational policies. In 2008, Daejeon City Museum of Art Creation Center was opened. Daejeon Museum of Art serves as a major public art museum contributing to the spread of art culture.

The museum's facilities includes an exhibition room, bookstore, auditorium, seminar room, resource room, training room, fountain park, and lawn park, and has a collection of 1,100 items.

See also
 National Science Museum

References

External links 
 

Museums in Daejeon
Art museums established in 1998
Modern art museums
Sculpture gardens, trails and parks in Asia
Art museums and galleries in South Korea
1998 establishments in South Korea